Plavić  is a village in Croatia.

Populated places in Krapina-Zagorje County